Ihor Klymovskyi (born 17 February 1972) is a Ukrainian professional football coach and a former player.

Career
As a player, he spent his career in the Ukrainian and Russian football clubs. From 2002 he is a football coach and in April 2019 was appointed as interim manager for the FC Olimpik in the Ukrainian Premier League until the end of season.
Since April 2021 he has been coaching FC Nyva Ternopil

References

External links
 

1972 births
Living people
People from Kostiantynivka
Association football defenders
Ukrainian footballers
Ukrainian expatriate footballers
Expatriate footballers in Russia
FC Metalurh Kostiantynivka players
FC Kramatorsk players
FC Mashynobudivnyk Druzhkivka players
FC Podillya Khmelnytskyi players
FC Metalurh Donetsk players
Ukrainian Premier League players
Ukrainian football managers
FC Olimpik Donetsk managers
Sportspeople from Donetsk Oblast